Manuel "Manolo" Blahnik Rodríguez (born 27 November 1942) is a Spanish fashion designer and founder of the eponymous high-end shoe brand.

Biography

Blahnik was born in Santa Cruz de la Palma, in the Canary Islands (Spain), to a Czech father and Spanish mother. His father left Prague in the 1930s to avoid rising fascism; his grandparents disappeared in the 1950s after the Communists took charge. His mother's family owned a banana plantation in the island city of Santa Cruz de la Palma, where he grew up alongside his sister, Evangelina. He was homeschooled as a child before eventually attending a Swiss boarding school. Later, his parents wanted him to be a diplomat and enrolled him at the University of Geneva majoring in Politics and Law. However, Blahnik changed his majors to Literature and Architecture. In 1965, he got his degree and moved to Paris to study art at the École des Beaux-Arts and Stage Set Design at the Louvre Art School, all while working at a vintage clothing shop. In 1969, he moved to London to work as a buyer at fashion boutique "Feathers" and wrote for L’Uomo Vogue, an Italian men's version of Vogue.

In 1969, Blahnik had a chance to meet Diana Vreeland, the editor-in-chief of U.S. Vogue, while he was traveling in New York. He then presented his portfolio of fashions and set designs to Vreeland, at which point she looked him straight in the eye and said, "Young man, make things, make accessories, make shoes." She admired his shoe sketches and advised him to concentrate on designing footwear. Blahnik followed her advice and worked on designing shoes.

In 1971, Ossie Clark invited him to create shoes for his runway show. He also designed shoes for other London fashion designers, such as Jean Muir and Zandra Rhodes. From 1971, Blahnik was selling Manolo Blahnik shoes for Zapata. With a loan of £2,000, Blahnik bought the Zapata Shoe Company from its owner and opened his own boutique. In 1974, Blahnik became the second man ever to be featured on the cover of U.K. Vogue (after Helmut Berger).

In 1977, Blahnik created his first American collection. These were sold in 1978 through Bloomingdales. Blahnik opened his first boutique in the US in 1979.

Manolo Blahnik's flagship store remains in Old Church Street in the Chelsea district of London.

Blahnik's boutiques are located in London, New York, Geneva, Madrid, Barcelona, Moscow, Dubai, Abu Dhabi, Doha, Hong Kong, Kuala Lumpur, Seoul, Singapore, Tokyo, and Taipei. Bloomingdales (for which he created his first American collection), Nordstrom, Neiman Marcus, Barneys, Bergdorf Goodman and Saks Fifth Avenue carry his line in the United States and newly opened in Dubai Mall. The company has signed a long-term deal with the shoewear retailer Kurt Geiger to operate Manolo Blahnik boutiques.

In 2000, Blahnik, together with Neiman Marcus, launched the first commercial virtual reality online showroom featuring 3D models of his shoes. The entire collection was sold out online within three weeks.

Blahnik was elevated to the International Best Dressed List Hall of Fame in 1987. In 2007, Blahnik was appointed as an honorary Commander of the Order of the British Empire for his service to the British fashion industry.

Blahnik currently resides in Bath, United Kingdom, and was awarded an honorary degree from Bath Spa University in July 2012.

Early development
One of Blahnik's greatest inspirations was his mother. She studied fashion magazines and interpreted the latest fashion trends on her clothing. Blahnik and his family often travelled to Paris and Madrid to order clothes. His mother was always dissatisfied with the shoes from their hometown so she made her own.  She learned the rudiments of her craft from a local Canary Island cobbler and, as a boy, Blahnik loved to watch his mother when she made beautiful shoes. He has inherited his mother's love for brocade and satin fabrics and recounted how, as a boy, he found a trunk filled with shoes by the famous Russian, Pierre Yantorny, all made from silks, antique lace and brocades trimmed with delicate buckles. All were light, elegant and feminine, attributes Blahnik later brought to his own designs.

When Blahnik was attending university he lived with his aunt and uncle. Meanwhile, his aunt deeply influenced his fashion sense and style. He refined his tastes and learned to appreciate the beauty of luxury, art, and happiness and beauty. Blahnik recalled that, according to his aunt, "happiness was having the single most elegant handbag ever made, in every color available."

Shoes
Blahnik never studied shoemaking formally. He learned the skills by visiting shoe factories and talking to pattern cutters, technicians, and machine operators. At first, he designed men's footwear, but he immediately found that men's shoe design limited his imagination and lacked the element of fashion so he focused on women's shoes. When mainstream shoe styles were still dominated by clunky platforms in the 1970s, he revived the sleek stiletto heel, which has since become a classic. Also, he dislikes wedges and believes in the power of heels and the sex appeal they convey.

Filmography
Blahnik is the subject of the 2017 documentary film: Manolo: The Boy Who Made Shoes for Lizards, written and directed by Michael Roberts.

Awards and honours
Council of Fashion Designers of America (CFDA)
 1987: Special Award
 1990: Accessory Designer of the Year
 1997: The Stiletto

British Fashion Council
 1999: Accessory Designer of the Year
 1990: Accessory Designer of the Year

Honors

 1998: Shoe Designer of the Year from Footwear News
 2003: Shoe Designer of the Year from Footwear News
 2007 Honorary CBE from Her Majesty Queen Elizabeth II
 2011 The SCAD (Savannah College of Art and Design) Andre Leon Talley Lifetime Achievement Award.
 2011 A Lifetime Achievement Award from Footwear News.
 2016 Honorary doctorate of the Universidad de La Laguna. 
2017 Ranked #25 best dressed man alive by Esquire magazine
2018: Luxury Legend Award by Walpole British Luxury Awards on 19 November

In popular culture

 In part one of the Twilight Saga: Breaking Dawn film, Bella Swan wears Manolo Blahnik's "Swan" pump for her wedding.
 The staff of the TV show Angel asked Manolo Blahnik for permission to use their company name on screen. The company then insisted that the characters wear the products even if the shoes were not shown on camera. 
 In the popular long-running TV show Sex and the City, Blahniks are a particular favorite of the character Carrie Bradshaw and as a result are mentioned frequently. A notable episode illustrating the brand's prestige is "What Goes Around Comes Around" from Season 3 in which Carrie is mugged. During her assault the assailant demands she surrender her shoes, demanding them by the brand's name. 
 They are referenced multiple times in Duck Dodgers whenever any sort of footwear defect occurs, typically with the grumbled phrase "Cheap counterfeit Manolo Blahniks".
 At the end of the fourth verse of the RuPaul dance music song "Click Clack (Make Dat Money)", from his album Glamazon, the drag queen "Supermodel of the World" sings "My Manolo Blahniks gonna party tonight".
 During the description of the third girl in "Weird Al" Yankovic's original song "Close, But No Cigar" he references the brand by noting: "She wore a ribbon on her left Manolo".
Costume designer Milena Canonero asked Blahnik to contribute the shoes to Sofia Coppola’s Marie Antoinette. The film went on to win the Academy Award for best costumes.
 On 28 September 2013, Saturday Night Live Season 39, Episode 1, included a sketch featuring Tina Fey that poked fun at the company.
 In the third part of the E. L. James Fifty Shades trilogy, a mirrored pair of Manolos are the accent to a clubbing night in Aspen, Colorado.
 Manolos are mentioned many times in Gossip Girl. Georgina Sparks mentions at the beginning of Season 3 that she owns a pair and that Blair can borrow them.
 American singer Jay-Z mentioned Manolo in his song "Bonnie and Clyde" ft. Beyoncé.
 German rapper Cro mentioned Manolo Blahnik along with Gucci and Lacoste in his song "Einmal um die Welt".
 In the second episode of the fourth season of ABC's Revenge, Emily Thorne is advised to "look beneath [her] Manolos" when she is searching for somebody who, according to a tracking device, is "right on top of her".
Mentioned in the opening song "Gulabi Aankhein" of the Bollywood movie Student of the Year along with Jimmy Choo, Stella McCartney, Gucci and others.
 In chapter 23 of the internationally bestselling novel The Rosie Project, Rosie says "any time you need entertaining, I could use a pair of Manolo Blahniks," and the main protagonist, from the word "pair", guesses that she is referring to shoes.
Mentioned in the song "You Are What You Wear" from American Psycho: The Musical.
The 2003 song "Shake Ya Tailfeather" by rappers Nelly Ft. Murphy Lee and P. Diddy contains the lyric "Manolos Ma-no-no's I can't tell".
In a Japanese high-school teen drama, "Hana Yori Dango", the female main character was given a pair of Manolo Blahnik during a party. The scene mentioned a saying, "A girl should wear nice shoes. Because the shoes will take her to a calm and beautiful place."
Mentioned in the song "Sex is in the Heel" from the musical Kinky Boots.
Referenced on the mixtape "Woke Alone" by rapper Mr. Bond.
Five-inch Blahnik stilettos mentioned en passant by Aunt Lydia in Chapter 20 of Margaret Atwood's “The Testaments”.
Mentioned in the film "Blood Feast 2: All U Can Eat" Directed by Herschell Gordon Lewis. At approximately twelve minutes into the first act, a young woman drops her shoes while walking barefoot along a dark rural road. As she retrieves them, she says "My Manolo Blahniks".
In the movie The Devil Wears Prada (film), Andrea, who works as an assistant to the editor-in-chief of Runway is given a pair of Manolo Blahnik from Nigel amongst other clothing items as a part of her makeover.
In the third season final episode ("Army of One") of the HBO original series The Sopranos, Adriana tells new acquaintance "Danielle" (undercover agent Ciccerone) that she "love[s] Blahniks, but they were killing me last night."

References

External links
 Official website
 
 Design Museum bio/profile

1942 births
Living people
People from La Palma
Privately held companies of the United Kingdom
Shoe companies of the United Kingdom
Shoe designers
Spanish brands
Spanish fashion designers
Spanish people of Czech descent
Spanish expatriates in Switzerland
University of Geneva alumni
High fashion brands
Honorary Commanders of the Order of the British Empire